S&W Centennial is a family of revolvers made by Smith & Wesson on the "J-Frame".  Depending upon caliber, the cylinder holds either 5 (9x19mm Parabellum, .38 Special +P, and .357 Magnum), 6 (.32 H&R Magnum), 7 (.22 Magnum), or 8 (.22 LR) cartridges. Centennials feature a fully enclosed (internal) hammer, which makes them Double Action Only (DAO) firearms.  Like all other "J-frame" Smith & Wesson revolvers, they have a swing-out cylinder. Centennial models have been made in different versions like PD "Personal Defense", LS "Lady Smith", and M&P "Military & Police"

History
The original Centennial Model 40 was introduced in 1952, and was named for the company's 100th anniversary.

Models

Model 40 and 42
The Smith & Wesson Model 40 originally debuted as the Centennial in 1952 and was renamed the Model 40 in 1957. The Model 40 is chambered in .38 special and has a five-round capacity. It is a snub-nose revolver with a 1 7/8-inch barrel. It is built on Smith & Wesson's J-frame and weighs 21 oz. empty.  The revolver was made with a grip safety as some shooters could not get used to the idea of firing a revolver without cocking the hammer.

Smith & Wesson reintroduced this model in 2007 as a collector's piece with some models featuring a case hardened finish by Doug Turnbull.

The Model 42 came out in 1952 as the Airweight Centennial but was changed in 1957 to the Model 42. The gun was the same design as the Model 40 except the frame was made of an aluminum alloy, resulting in a lower weight than the Model 40. The Model 42 was discontinued in 1974.

Model 640

The Model 640 revolver has been in production since 1990 and was chambered for .38 Special.  It was fitted with a standard barrel of 1-7/8 inch length. The second model had a slightly heavier and longer barrel of 2-1/8 inch length. A 3" barreled version was offered until 1993, when it was dropped from production.
In 1996 S&W began chambering the 640 in .357 Magnum.  Because of the power of the .357 magnum cartridge, the frame is strengthened just in front of the cylinder release on those models.

Model 442 and 642
The 442 has an aluminum frame and blued carbon steel cylinder. The 642 has an aluminum frame and stainless steel cylinder.  From 1993 through 1996, the 442 was made with a satin nickel finish.

Model 940
In 1991 S&W introduced the Model 940, similar in appearance to the 640, but chambered in 9mm Luger. Use of a moon clip is required to headspace and extract the rimless 9mm cartridges. The 940 could also chamber and extract the short-lived 9mm Federal (9x19mmR) rimmed cartridge. From 1991 to 1992, a 3-inch barreled version was available. In 1998, the 940 was dropped from production.

Model 340 and 342
In 2001 an aluminium alloy framed version was introduced in .357 Magnum designated as the Model 340.  This revolver weighs 10.9 ounces.
The model M&P 342 was introduced in 2001 as a special run of revolvers that are identical to a Model 340 but chambered only for .38 Special +P due to some police departments ammunition restrictions.

Design limitations (Scandium Versions)
Ammunition with bullet weight less than  should not be used due to the risk of frame erosion from powder that is still burning after expulsion of the light projectile.  Further, recoil may propel the cases of unfired rounds in the cylinder rearward, with enough force to unseat the bullets, causing the cylinder to jam.   Accuracy is compromised in these ultra-light revolvers since the barrel is a steel sleeve liner rather than a single solid piece of steel.

References

External links
The Smith & Wesson Centennial, History and Development.
Review of the Smith & Wesson Model 642CT.
Ballistics By The Inch tests of the .38 Special cartridge.

Smith & Wesson revolvers
Revolvers of the United States
.38 Special firearms
Police weapons
.357 Magnum firearms
9mm Parabellum revolvers
.22 LR revolvers